The Women's individual pursuit at the 2011 UCI Track Cycling World Championships was held on March 25. 18 athletes participated in the contest. After the qualification, the fastest 2 riders advanced to the Final and the 3rd and 4th fastest riders raced for the bronze medal.

Results

Qualifying
The Qualifying was held at 14:00.

Finals
The finals were held at 20:55.

References

2011 UCI Track Cycling World Championships
UCI Track Cycling World Championships – Women's individual pursuit